Sidnei Siqueira Lourenço or simply Sidnei (born June 29, 1983 in São José do Rio Pardo), is a Brazilian left back. He currently plays for Santa Cruz.

Honours
São Paulo State League: 2002

Contract
12 June 2007 to 30 December 2008

External links
 CBF
 terceiroanel
 juventus.com
 gazeta
 primeira
 atletico.com.br

1983 births
Living people
Brazilian footballers
Clube Atlético Juventus players
Ituano FC players
Esporte Clube Santo André players
Tupi Football Club players
Clube Atlético Mineiro players
Clube de Regatas Brasil players
Associação Portuguesa de Desportos players
Fortaleza Esporte Clube players
Association football defenders
People from São José do Rio Pardo